Frederick George Roberts (1 April 1862 – 7 April 1936) was an English cricketer and umpire who played first-class cricket for Gloucestershire from 1887 to 1905.

Roberts made his debut for Gloucestershire against Yorkshire in July 1887. The left-handed cricketer appeared in 211 matches for his county. His best bowling performance was 8–40 in a match versus Kent in May 1897. After his playing career had ended, Roberts became an umpire and officiated in 201 first-class matches between 1906 and 1923

References

1862 births
1936 deaths
People from Mickleton, Gloucestershire
Gloucestershire cricketers
English cricketers of 1890 to 1918
English cricketers
English cricket umpires
Gentlemen of England cricketers
Sportspeople from Gloucestershire